Ranendra "Ronen" Sen (born 9 April 1944) is an Indian diplomat who was India's ambassador to the United States of America from August 2004 to March 2009. His contribution to the landmark US India Nuclear Deal of 2005 is considered of immense importance.

Career
Mr. Sen served as an Independent Director of Tata Motors,  from 1 June 2010 till 2012. On 1 April 2015, Mr. Sen was appointed as a non-executive independent director on the board of Tata Sons, the promoter company of major companies in the Tata Group.

Controversies

"Headless chicken" remark
In August 2007, Sen was issued notice (and subsequently censured) by the Parliamentary Privileges Committee to explain the "headless chicken" remark he was alleged to have made in an off-the-record interview published by Rediff.com on 20, August 2007, titled: "We will have zero credibility" on the Atomic Energy Pact.  Sen had said:

It has been approved here (in Washington, DC) by the President, and there (in New Delhi) it's been approved by the Indian cabinet. So why do you have all this running around like a headless chicken, looking for a comment here or comment there, and these little storms in a tea-cup?

Following the uproar over this remark, Sen later tendered his apology before the Parliamentary Privileges Committee. Sen clarified:
My comment about "running round like headless chicken looking for a comment here or comment there" was a tactless observation on some of my media friends, and most certainly not with reference to any Honourable Member of Parliament.

The Lok Sabha Committee and the Rajya Sabha, panel decided to close the issue,  since "Sen has tendered unconditional and sincere apologies". The Rajya Sabha Committee said, in it report, tabled in the House:In view of Sen's acceptance of having made the impugned remarks and that the same were unwarranted, and having tendered his unconditional apology, the Committee recommends that the matter should be allowed to rest here.In its uncharacteristic censure, the Rajya Sabha panel felt his remarks were:
not only in poor taste but also unwarranted... personal frame of mind should not have influenced public utterances of a senior and experienced diplomat... The Committee expects that such lapses, as admitted by him, shall not recur

References

External links
 The Washington Diplomat Newspaper - Ambassador profile 
 Profile on website of Indian embassy
 Ronen Sen lobbying for Dow Chemicals

Ambassadors of India to the United States
Ambassadors of India to Russia
Ambassadors of India to Mexico
Ambassadors of India to Germany
High Commissioners of India to the United Kingdom
1944 births
University of Calcutta alumni
Living people
Recipients of the Padma Bhushan in civil service